Kabongo is a territory in the Haut-Lomami province of the Democratic Republic of the Congo.

Territories of Haut-Lomami Province